English-Albanian singer Dua Lipa began her music career in 2014, signing a record deal with Warner Bros. Records. The following year, she released her debut single "New Love", followed by her eponymous debut studio album two years later. Prior to the album's release, she released three extended plays (EP), Spotify Sessions (2016)  Be the One  (EP) (2016) and The Only (2017) . Of the 25 songs included on all editions of Dua Lipa, Lipa co-wrote 21. The album encompassed dance-pop, electropop and R&B genres. Many of the songs were produced by Stephen Kozmeniuk, however she worked a variety of songwriters and producers including Coldplay frontman Chris Martin, who co-wrote "Homesick", and Digital Farm Animals, who produced "Be the One". Collaborations on the record include "Lost in Your Light" featuring Miguel, "Kiss and Make Up" with Blackpink, "One Kiss" with Calvin Harris, "Electricity" with Silk City, previously Collaborations "Scared to Be Lonely" with Martin Garrix (2017) and "No Lie" by Sean Paul featuring Lipa. (2016)  The singer released the EPs Live Acoustic (2017), which featured cover versions of songs by other artists, and Deezer Sessions (2019). She also recorded "Swan Song" for the 2019 film Alita: Battle Angel, and "High", a collaboration with Whethan, for the Fifty Shades Freed soundtrack. In 2017 and 2020, Lipa featured on charity singles "Bridge over Troubled Water" and "Times Like These" as part of the Artists for Grenfell and Radio One Allstars, respectively.

Lipa's second studio album Future Nostalgia was released in March 2020, preceded by the singles, "Don't Start Now", "Physical" and "Break My Heart". The album marked a change in sound for the singer encompassing a 1980s and Studio 54-influenced disco and pop sound, opting for more live instrumentation. Lipa co-wrote every song on the record and collaborated with many of the same songwriters and producers as on her first album, as well as new ones including Tove Lo, who co-wrote "Cool", and Julia Michaels who co wrote "Pretty Please" as well as Lipa's collaboration with Angèle, "Fever". To accompany the record, she released a remix album with the Blessed Madonna titled Club Future Nostalgia, that featured a remix of "Levitating" featuring Madonna and Missy Elliott as well as a remix of "Physical" featuring Gwen Stefani. The project also included "Prisoner" by Miley Cyrus featuring Lipa, "Not My Problem" featuring JID, a remix of "Levitating" featuring DaBaby and "Un Día (One Day)" with J Balvin, Bad Bunny and Tainy.

Songs

Unreleased songs

See also
 Dua Lipa discography

References

Notes
Notes for remixes

Notes for covers

Notes for band members

Citations

 
Lipa, Dua